Events in the year 2014 in Latvia.

Incumbents 
 President – Andris Bērziņš
 Prime Minister – Valdis Dombrovskis (until 22 January), Laimdota Straujuma (starting 22 January)

Events

January 
 January 1 – Latvia officially adopts the Euro as its currency and becomes the 18th member of the Eurozone.

October 
 October 4 – Latvia votes in a parliamentary election; Laimdota Straujuma's centre-right government keeps its majority.

References 

 
2010s in Latvia
Years of the 21st century in Latvia
Latvia
Latvia